Ingerborg Innerhofer was an Austrian luger who competed in the early 1980s. A natural track luger, she won the gold medal in the women's singles at the 1983 FIL European Luge Natural Track Championships in St. Konrad, Austria.

References
Natural track European Championships results 1970-2006.

Austrian female lugers
Living people
Year of birth missing (living people)
20th-century Austrian women